James C. Nelson (born February 20, 1944) is a retired American attorney and jurist who served as an associate justice of the Montana Supreme Court from 1993 through 2012, having been appointed to the Court by Republican Governor Marc Racicot in May 1993.

Early life and education
Born in Moscow, Idaho, Nelson earned his Bachelor of Science degree from the University of Idaho in 1966. After graduating, he served in the United States Army for three years, being discharged as a first lieutenant in 1969 to serve as a financial analyst with the U.S. Securities and Exchange Commission.

Career
After earning his Juris Doctor degree with honors from George Washington University Law School in 1974, he moved to Cut Bank, Montana to take over his father-in-law's law firm. After representing a Native American tribe, the tribe gave him the honorary name of E-E-Nistowas, or Buffalo Body.

During this time, he served as President of the Glacier Chamber of Commerce, Chairman of the Montana Board of Oil and Gas Conservation, and a member of the Montana Gaming Advisory Council and the Governor's Task Force on Corrections and Criminal Justice Policy. He served as Glacier County Attorney, the county's top prosecutor, until May 1993 when Republican Governor Marc Racicot (the Chairman of the George W. Bush's 2004 presidential campaign) appointed Nelson to the Montana Supreme Court.

Supreme Court tenure
In 1997, Nelson wrote the court's opinion in Gryczan v. Montana striking down as unconstitutional a law that had criminalized gay sex, six years before the U.S. Supreme Court ruled similarly in Lawrence v. Texas.

In 1997, Nelson wrote the court's opinion in Montana v. Siegal ruling that police usage of thermal imaging technology to find a marijuana growing operation required a search warrant, four years before the U.S. Supreme Court ruled similarly in Kyllo v. United States in a decision written by Justice Antonin Scalia.

In a 2009 child custody case between two same-sex partners, Kulstad v. Maniaci, Nelson gained attention from the media and civil rights groups for his concurring opinion that stated:

In 2010, Nelson wrote the court's unanimous opinion striking down a court rule that had previously prohibited the inclusion of forensic evidence because the medical examiner could not determine the cause of death. Nelson's ruling made it easier for prosecutors to introduce evidence against defendants by discussing past crimes, behaviors, and events. In this particular case, Nelson's ruling enabled prosecutors to bring in evidence of an infant's brain bruising and multiple rib fractures in prosecuting the infant's mother for murder.

Personal life
Nelson and his wife, Chari, have two children, Mary Pat and Jay, and four grandchildren.

See also
Dark Money

References

External links

 Official biography at the Montana Supreme Court

1944 births
Living people
People from Moscow, Idaho
University of Idaho alumni
George Washington University Law School alumni
United States Army officers
Military personnel from Idaho
U.S. Securities and Exchange Commission personnel
Montana lawyers
County district attorneys in Montana
Justices of the Montana Supreme Court
People from Cut Bank, Montana